The 2016–17 Alabama Crimson Tide women's basketball team represents the University of Alabama in the 2016–17 NCAA Division I women's basketball season. The Crimson Tide, led by fourth year head coach Kristy Curry, played their games at Coleman Coliseum and were members of the Southeastern Conference. They finished the season 22–14, 5–11 in SEC play to finish in a tie for eleventh place. They advanced to the quarterfinals of SEC women's tournament where they lost to Kentucky. They were invited to the Women's National Invitation Tournament defeat Mercer, Little Rock and Tulane in the first, second and third rounds before losing to Georgia Tech in the quarterfinals.

Roster

Schedule

|-
!colspan=9 style="background:#990000; color:#FFFFFF;"| Exhibition

|-
!colspan=9 style="background:#990000; color:#FFFFFF;"| Non-conference regular season

|-
!colspan=9 style="background:#990000; color:#FFFFFF;"| SEC regular season

|-
!colspan=12 style="text-align: center; background:#990000"|SEC Women's Tournament

|-
!colspan=12 style="text-align: center; background:#990000"|Women's National Invitation Tournament

Rankings

See also
2016–17 Alabama Crimson Tide men's basketball team

References

Alabama
Alabama Crimson Tide women's basketball seasons
2017 Women's National Invitation Tournament participants
Alabama Crimson Tide
Alabama Crimson Tide